The Nigerian Financial Intelligence Unit (NFIU) is the federal agency responsible for collecting and analyzing disclosures from reporting organizations, in order to produce financial intelligence to other agencies combating money laundering, terrorism financing, and other financial crimes.

Operations 
The NFIU was established in 2004 as an autonomous unit within the central coordinating body for the country’s Anti-Money Laundering, Counter-Terrorist Financing, and Counter-Proliferation Financing (AML/CFT/CPF) framework of Central Bank of Nigeria. It also operates as part of Economic and Financial Crimes Commission.

In 2007, the NFIU joined the Egmont Group of Financial Intelligence Units, an international organization that facilitates cooperation and intelligence sharing between national financial intelligence units to investigate and prevent money laundering and terrorist financing.

In the first quarter of 2022, about N150 trillion worth of transactions in Nigeria were reported as “suspicious” by the NFIU.

In January 2023, NFIU issued a ban on the federal, state, and local governments from making cash withdrawals from their own accounts. According to the NFIU, this was implemented as a measure to curb financial abuses of government funds as state governments had withdrawn a total of N701 billion cash from 2015 till January 2023. This was criticized by the Nigerian Governors Forum which stated that the NFIU advisory and guidelines on cash transactions were outside the agency's mandate.

References 

2004 establishments in Nigeria
Nigerian intelligence agencies
Organizations based in Lagos
Finance in Nigeria
Financial crime prevention
Law enforcement in Nigeria